Lee Robert Jenkins (born 17 March 1961) is an English former footballer who played in the Football League for Aston Villa, Port Vale and Birmingham City, and also played in Finland for RoPS and FinnPa.

Career
Jenkins was born in West Bromwich, Staffordshire. A midfield player, he began his football career as an apprentice with Aston Villa in June 1977. The following year he was part of the Villa side that reached the final of the FA Youth Cup, and in January 1979 he signed his first full professional contract and was capped for England at youth level. Jenkins made three substitute appearances in the First Division before joining Port Vale in November 1980. His only appearance was on Boxing Day 1980 in a 1–0 home defeat by Lincoln City. Given a free transfer in April 1981, he moved to Finland where he played for Rovaniemi in the Mestaruussarja (top division). Jenkins returned to England, signing for Birmingham City in October 1985. He broke his ankle on his Birmingham debut, and the following April, with the club in financial difficulties, he was given a free transfer. He then returned to Finland where he played for FinnPa.

Career statistics
Source:

References

1961 births
Living people
Sportspeople from West Bromwich
English footballers
England youth international footballers
Association football midfielders
Aston Villa F.C. players
Port Vale F.C. players
English expatriate footballers
Expatriate footballers in Finland
Rovaniemen Palloseura players
Birmingham City F.C. players
FinnPa players
English Football League players